Streptomyces kasugaensis is a bacterium species from the genus of Streptomyces which has been isolated from soil from the city Nara in Japan. Streptomyces kasugaensis produces kasugamycin and thiolutin.

Further reading

See also 
 List of Streptomyces species

References

External links
Type strain of Streptomyces kasugaensis at BacDive -  the Bacterial Diversity Metadatabase	

kasugaensis
Bacteria described in 1995